Hong Kong Amateur Hockey Club (HKAHC) is a non-profit making sport organization aimed at promoting the sport of ice hockey so to make it accessible for all in Hong Kong.

History 
Ice hockey has a history of over 30 years in Hong Kong.  In the early days, it was a sport popular among the expatriate circle, namely the Americans and the Canadians.  In the past decade, the sport of ice hockey has been well received by local residents.  Prior to June 2007, it was estimated that there were about 550 active hockey players in Hong Kong and this number has significantly increased to 1,000 now and the majority are local Chinese.

Founded in 2001, Hong Kong Amateur Hockey Club is a non-profit making sport organization aimed at promoting the sport of ice hockey so to make it accessible for all in Hong Kong.  HKAHC is run by a group of volunteers who are either players themselves or avid fans who want to see the sport of ice hockey easily enjoyed by everyone in the territory.

Key Activities
Hong Kong Amateur Hockey Club holds and takes part in a variety of competitions including local hockey league competitions and internationally friendly matches so to encourage more people, especially the youngsters in Hong Kong who have not tasted the joy of ice hockey before, to actually see and touch the game and enjoy the unique excitement of this ultimate sport on ice.

Hong Kong Amateur Hockey League
Over the years, Hong Kong Amateur Hockey Club has been organizing various hockey leagues, solely and/or jointly with other hockey organizations. The league is now divided into two major divisions,
 
Regular Division for the advanced players
Novice Division for beginner players

There is currently over 180 players competing in HKAHC league games. The players, aged 13 to over 40, come from all walks of life.  Many of them started with figure skating or roller-blade, and later showed strong interest once they were introduced to the game of ice hockey and found it was not uncommon in Hong Kong.

HKAHC - Asian Youth Hockey League
In the past decade, ice hockey in Asia has been steadily growing. To strengthen ice hockey in major cities in Asia and to encourage more exchanges between youth hockey, starting 2011, Hong Kong Amateur Hockey Club worked together with Beijing, Harbin, Taipei and other cities’ hockey organizations, to hold the Asian Youth Hockey League to bring ice hockey to more territories in the Asia Pacific region and to provide an elite youth hockey league platform for youngsters to compete.  The first stop of the 2011 HKAHC - Asian Youth Hockey League was held on 8 February 2011 in Hong Kong.

HKAHC International Amateur Ice Hockey Tournament
Since 2003, Hong Kong Amateur Hockey Club has been hosting the annual International Amateur Ice Hockey Tournament with teams coming from countries and territories including Canada, China, Japan, Macau, the Philippines, Taipei and Hong Kong. The Tournament often creates a city-wide buzz and is becoming one of the annual highlights on Hong Kong’s sporting calendar.  The Tournament attracts fans from both the sports field and the general public as well as wide media coverage.

References
 Chinese Ice Hockey Association(CIHA)
 Hong Kong Academy of Ice Hockey (HKAIH)
 Hong Kong Ice Hockey Association (HKIHA)
 Hong Kong Sports Institute(HKSI)
 International Ice Hockey Federation(IIHF)
 Macau Ice Sports Federation
 MegaIce at MegaBox
 Sky Rink at Dragon Centre
 Taipei Ice Hockey Association 
 The Rink at Elements
 Typhoons Ice Hockey Club
 Women's Ice Hockey Organization (WIHO)

Sports teams in Hong Kong
Amateur ice hockey
Ice hockey in Hong Kong